Mediaproducción, S.L.U., better known as Mediapro, is a multimedia communications group in Spain founded in April 1994 in Barcelona. The company is well involved in movie and television production.

The company holds branch offices in Madrid, Seville, Girona, Lisbon, Madeira, Budapest, Miami, Buenos Aires, Santa Cruz de la Sierra, Rio de Janeiro, Porto, Qatar, Amsterdam, and Tenerife. 

Chinese private equity firm Orient Hontai Capital (founded in 2015) has currently controlled Mediapro since 2018.

Operations

Canada 
On 21 February 2019, Canadian Soccer Business announced that Mediapro would serve as the exclusive media rightsholder of Canada Soccer, including rights to the Canadian Premier League, the Canadian Championship, and national team matches. In April, Mediapro announced OneSoccer, a subscription service that would carry this content.

France 
On 29 May 2018, Ligue de Football Professionnel (LFP) announced that Mediapro had acquired four of the five main lots for media rights to Ligue 1 and Ligue 2 for 2020-21 through 2023–24. Mediapro partnered with TF1 Group to form a new channel known as Téléfoot to hold these rights. In December 2020, after missing two rights payments early in its first season (citing a desire to renegotiate the contract due to the financial impact of the COVID-19 pandemic), Mediapro and the LFP agreed to exit the contract.

Argentina 
On January 20, 2022, CNDC ordered The Walt Disney Company to divest the Fox Sports television network from the acquisition of 21st Century Fox in order to get an approval from the government of Argentina. On February 15, 2022, Mediapro announced it would acquire Fox Sports Argentina from Disney. The sale was approved by the CNDC on April 27, 2022.

See also 
Media Coach

References

External links 
 

Mass media companies of Spain
Mass media in Barcelona
1994 establishments in Spain